In Basque mythology,  (also , ,) is the male half of a pre-Christian Basque deity associated with storms and thunder. He is normally imagined as a dragon or serpent.

In one myth  seduces a Scottish princess in the village of Mundaka to father the mythical first Lord of Biscay, Jaun Zuria. This legend is believed to be a fabrication made to legitimize the Lordship of Biscay as a separate state from Navarre, because there is no historical account of such a lord.

Etymology 

, another name of the same deity, has two possible interpretations, either a  +  (former, "old serpent") or  +  ("high fire"). There is no likely etymology for the third name of this god, .

Local legends on  
He is said to have been witnessed crossing the sky in form of fire-sickle, what is considered presage of storms. In this area is also said that  punishes the children that disobey their parents.
He meets  on Fridays (the day of the akelarre or sabbat), conceiving then the storms.
There they say that he travels through the sky in the shape of a fireball, between the mountains Balerdi and Elortalde.

See also 
 Herensuge (Basque dragon)

References 

 

Basque mythology
Basque and Iberian deities
Sky and weather gods
Thunder gods
European dragons
Basque legendary creatures